Kagal Assembly constituency is one of the 288 Vidhan Sabha (legislative assembly) constituencies of Maharashtra state in western India.

Overview
Kagal (constituency number 273) is one of the ten Vidhan Sabha constituencies located in the Kolhapur district. This constituency covers the entire Kagal tehsil and parts of the Ajra and Gaghinglaj tehsils of this district.

Kagal is part of the Kolhapur Lok Sabha constituency along with five other Vidhan Sabha segments in this district, namely Chandgad, Radhanagari, Kolhapur South, Karvir and Kolhapur North.

Members of Legislative Assembly

See also
 Kagal
 List of constituencies of Maharashtra Vidhan Sabha

References

Assembly constituencies of Kolhapur district
Assembly constituencies of Maharashtra